Chembai Vaidyanatha Bhagavatar was one of the finest Carnatic music vocalists of the 20th century. This is a list of concerts and events that helped shape his career as a popular Carnatic musician.

Arangetram & first paid concerts (1904)
He had his arangetram or debut, a concert of two hours' duration, when he performed together with his brother Subramanian in 1904. The brothers had their first paid concert in 1905 at a temple festival in a town called Ottapalam in the Palakkad district of Kerala. A little later, there was another noteworthy concert at Kantallur Parthasarathy Temple. Anantha Bhagavatar himself provided the violin accompaniment, while mridanga support was given by well-known stage actor Chokkanathapuram Ayya Bhagavatar.

Vaikom and Guruvayur performances (1907)
One of the landmarks in the early career of the brothers was their concert at the temple festival in Vaikom, known for the annual musical feast it provided. At this concert in 1907, the father again provided violin support. Chembai thereafter made it a practice to sing at the Vaikom festival every year. After the Vaikom concert, Anantha Bhagavatar took the boys to Guruvayur, another important temple town where again they had a successful concert. Guruvayur too became a regular part of the Chembai's concert programme every year. Thus Vaidyanathan and Subrahmaniam imbibed from an early age not only the knowledge of music that their father had but also the tradition of a religious life which had marked the family for generations.

A year with Kaliakudi Natesa Sastry (1909)

When Kaliakudi Natesa Sastry of Tiruvarur, an exponent of the art of Harikatha (musical discourse), came to Chembai village, Anantha Bhagavatar and his family attended the programmes, leading to the boys joining Sastry's troupe. Their concert in Tiruvarur (in Tanjavur district) at a guru pooja festival at which Natesa Sastrigal gave a discourse was especially notable, because it was at this concert that the boys were heard for the first time by Pudukkottai Dakshinamurthy Pillai, a famed exponent of the mridangam and kanjira. During their sojourn with Natesa Sastry, they had not only been singing at various places, they had also taken every possible opportunity of listening to famous musicians whenever they performed, such as Namakkal Narasimha Iyengar, Kallidaikurichi Vedanta Bhagavatar, Ramanathapuram Srinivasa Iyengar, Konerirajapuram Vaidyanatha Iyer, Harikesanallur Muthiah Bhagavatar, Madurai Pushpavanam, Tirukodikaval Krishna Iyer, Malaikkottai Govindaswamy Pillai and Pudukkottai Dakshinamurthy Pillai. This learning by listening was a valuable facet of the brothers' training. After about a year's absence, the brothers returned to Chembai in 1910 as experienced musicians.

Accolades from Palghat Anantharama Bhagavatar (1911)
The quality of the musicianship of the brothers was testified to by Palghat Anantharama Bhagavatar who was present at a concert in Sekharipuram in 1911. Particularly complimenting Vaidyanatha Bhagavatar's voice, he predicted a bright future for him.

Violin and flute training (1912)
Chembai also started learning to play the violin, something with which he was already familiar, his father being also a violinist. He attained some proficiency, enough to be able to accompany singers (which helped him when he was to lose his voice in 1952). For about a year he in fact accompanied flautist Anantha Bhagavatar, who was his sister Narayani's husband. He was also interested in the flute and learnt to play it well enough to perform a few concerts on this instrument.

Karur concert (1913)
A patron of the arts and artists named Pethachi Chettiar lived in Karur (near Trichy). He used to conduct a festival featuring music concerts by the leading musical lights of the day. The arrangements of this music test were the responsibility of the celebrated musician and vaggeyakara Harikesanallur Muthiah Bhagavatar. Chembai wanted to attend this music festival and he and his brother proceeded to Karur. He met Muthiah Bhagavatar and expressed his desire to perform in the festival. Muthiah Bhagavatar had told him that the performance schedules were prepared in advance and could not be altered. Chembai was keenly disappointed, but destiny took a hand. The violin accompanist for a jalatarangam concert failed to arrive. Chembai persuaded the artist to avail of his own services and she agreed. The concert turned out well and, as was customary, Chembai was handed over his payment for the part he had played. He, however, expressed a wish not to be paid in cash, saying that he had actually wanted only to sing. He explained he was building up a career as a vocalist, though he also knew how to play the violin; and that he would prize a different kind of payment, that of a chance to sing before such a distinguished audience. Muthiah Bhagavatar and Pethachi Chettiar were persuaded by this reasoning and promised Chembai the stage for the following day, where he performed to the appreciation of all.

Pondicherry concert (1915)
He received an invitation to sing at a wedding in the family of one Jnanaprakasa Mudaliar in Pondicherry. Until then the brothers had given full-fledged concerts mostly in and around Chembai. True, they had been to several places with Natesa Sastrigal and sung at his discourses, but these mini-concerts were more in the nature of interludes, of subsidiary performances. The performance in Pondicherry made Chembai known over a wider area leading later to more concert opportunities.

Ernakulam concert (1915)
Chembai secured a similar opportunity of significance again in 1915. A leading citizen of Ernakulam, named T.A.Duraiswami lyer was conducting an annual Tyagaraja festival which attracted important performers of the day and a throng of listeners. It was considered a privilege to sing at the festival. Chembai went to Ernakulam and requested Duraiswami lyer a chance for him also to sing. Duraiswami lyer agreed. As customary at such festivals, Chembai sang for the limited time allotted to him and was about to get up, when there was a chorus of requests for one more number and he had to oblige! Here he had forged a friendship with T.G.Krishna Iyer (nephew of Duraiswami Iyer) whose compositions he was to set to classical music, and popularise later.

Thiruvavaduthurai concert (1915)
Chembai had heard about  'Sreelasree' Ambalavana Desikar (pontiff of the Tiruvavaduturai matha) and his discriminating knowledge of music. He wanted to have a chance to sing before him and proceeded to Tiruvavaduturai with his brother. At Desikar's suggestion, Chembai rendered in viruttam form the verse 'Kanduka madakkariyai vasamai nadattalam'. Desikar went on prompting Chembai about the ragas he should sing and the youngster responded enthusiastically. Impressed by the performance, Desikar ordered that a katcheri (concert) by Chembai be held the next day. A highlight of the concert was that the mridanga accompaniment was provided by the famous Azhagianambi Pillai.

Palakkad ramanavami concert (1916)
Another significant event in Chembai's early career was his concert at the Ramanavami festival in Palakkad in 1916. Among those who attended the concert was Pudukkotai Dakshinamurthy Pillai. After the festival, Pillai returned to Trichy to meet the violin maestro Govindaswamy Pillai and told him of the calibre of Chembai's music. They made arrangements for a kutcheri by Vaidyanatha Bhagavatar in Trichy. Govindaswamy Pillai himself provided the violin accompaniment while Dakshinamurthy Pillai played the mridanga. The concert met Govindaswamy Pillai's expectations and Vaidyanatha Bhagavatar had the opportunity to sing at various other places, with the two Pillais themselves playing the accompaniment in most of the concerts.

First concert in Madras (1918)
Chembai's first concert in Madras was in 1918, at the Triplcane Sangeeta Sabha. Rasikas who had heard about the young vidwan were keenly looking forward to the event and the sale of tickets was very brisk. As the concert was about to begin, the hall was filled to capacity, with a large number restless listeners not able to gain entrance. This rose to a clamour as the concert started and the organisers had finally to keep the entrance doors open to pacify everyone. The concert, featuring as sidemen Govindaswamy Pillai on the violin, Azhagunambi Pillai on the mridanga and Dakshinamurthy Pillai on the kanjira, was an impressive effort.

First concert with Chowdiah and Palghat Mani Iyer (1924)
T.Chowdiah, was a violinist who invented the seven-stringed violin and became a very popular exponent in it. Chembai met him in 1924 at the house of a common friend, and became good friends. Chembai had been discussing music avidly with him at their first meeting when it developed into a musical challenge between them, at the end of which both recognised the other's proficiency. Chembai performed with Chowdiah in the Jagannatha Bhakta Sabha. It was in this concert that Chembai had introduced young Palghat Mani Iyer (who was to become one of the great mridangam players) to a discerning audience. At a similar concert in 1926, he had also introduced Palani Subramaniam Pillai, disciple of Pudukottai Dakshinamurthi Pillai.

Inaugural performance at Madras Music Academy (1927)

The annual meeting of the Indian National Congress was held in a different city every year. In 1927, it was held in Madras. Music concerts were arranged in the sidelines of the meeting, where it was decided that an institution to promote classical music in south India should be started in Madras. Thus the Madras Music Academy was born, and Chembai was one of the singers who were invited to give the inaugural concerts.

See also
Chembai Vaidyanatha Bhagavatar
Carnatic Music
South India
Kerala
Indian Classical Music

References

Carnatic music
Chembai